William Wake  (died 1750) was Governor of Bombay for the English East India Company from 26 November 1742 to 17 November 1750. 

He married Elizabeth Elwin (d.1759), a daughter of Fountain Elwin of Thurning, Norfolk, where she is buried. Two mural monuments, one to Wake the other to his wife, survive in St Andrew's Church, Thurning. He had issue an only daughter:
Margaret Wake (c.1732-1819), wife of Col. William Tryon (1729-1788), Governor of the Province of North Carolina (1765–1771) and of the Province of New York (1771–1780).

Wake died in 1750 in South Africa during his return voyage to England.

References

Governors of Bombay
Year of birth unknown
1750 deaths